Portious Warren (born 2 March 1996) is an athlete from Trinidad and Tobago competing in the shot put and discus throw. She won a silver medal in the former at the 2019 Summer Universiade.

International competitions

1No mark in the final

Personal bests
Outdoors
Shot put – 18.75 (Tokyo 2021)
Discus throw – 54.62 (Baton Rouge 2019)
Hammer throw – 48.39 (Mesa 2017)
Javelin throw – 38.79 (Mesa 2017)
Weight throw – 20.33 (Fayetteville 2019)

Indoors
Shot put – 17.41 (Birmingham, AL 2019)

References

1996 births
Living people
Trinidad and Tobago shot putters
Trinidad and Tobago discus throwers
Athletes (track and field) at the 2019 Pan American Games
Pan American Games competitors for Trinidad and Tobago
Universiade medalists for Trinidad and Tobago
Universiade medalists in athletics (track and field)
Medalists at the 2019 Summer Universiade
Competitors at the 2018 Central American and Caribbean Games
Alabama Crimson Tide women's track and field athletes
Athletes (track and field) at the 2020 Summer Olympics
Olympic athletes of Trinidad and Tobago
Trinidad and Tobago female athletes